Kalni Express (Train no. 773/774) is an intercity train which runs between Dhaka (capital of Bangladesh) and Sylhet (north-eastern major city). Kalni Express was conceived to be the non stop train of Dhaka-Sylhet route of Bangladesh Railway but it has since lost that status.

History 
Kalni Express made its inaugural run on 15 May 2012 with a view to meet demands of increasing passengers of Dhaka-Sylhet route 
. The train started its inaugural journey with total 12 carriages including an AC carriage.

Schedule 
The train runs between Dhaka and Sylhet district while touching other districts like Kishoreganj, Brahmanbaria, Habiganj and Maulavibazar. It departs Dhaka railway station at 03:00 PM (Bangladesh Standard Time) and arrives Sylhet at 09:30 PM. In return trip, it departs Sylhet at 06:15 AM and arrives Dhaka at 01:00 PM. Friday is the weekly holiday of this train.

Stoppages 
 Dhaka Bimanbondor
 Bhairab Bazar Junction (Only For 774)
 Narsingdi (Only For 774)
 Azampur
 Shaiestaganj
 Srimangal
 Shamshernagar
 Kulaura
 Maijgaon

References

External links

Named passenger trains of Bangladesh
Transport in Sylhet